Antonio de Escaño y García de Cáceres (Cartagena, Murcia, 1750 - Cádiz, 12 July 1814) was a Spanish military officer and government official. He served in several naval battles including the Battle of Trafalgar. He was Spain's Minister of the Navy and a member of the Council of Regency. A Spanish Navy school named for him states: "He is regarded as one of the best naval tacticians of the 18th century. An enlightened man, he devoted himself to the study of shipbuilding and other academic disciplines such as chemistry, botany and history, of which he was an academic."

Biography

Early career
Escaño became a midshipman at the age of 17 and took part in almost every major Spanish naval operation of his time. These included the Battle of Cape Spartel (1782), which was an indecisive naval battle between a British fleet under Admiral Richard Howe and a Franco-Spanish fleet under Spanish Admiral Luis de Córdova; an expedition against Algiers (1783) to attack Barbary raiders; and the Battle of Cape St Vincent (1797), where thanks to his military perceptiveness while in command of the Príncipe de Asturias, he helped to save the Spanish flagship, the Santísima Trinidad, when the squadron commander José de Córdoba y Ramos lost control over the situation while under attack by British Commodore Horatio Nelson. For this, Escaño was rewarded with the Order of Santiago. 

He was then part of the successful defense of Cadiz (1797) against a British fleet under Admiral John Jervis and Rear Admiral Horatio Nelson. Escaño later served during the Battle of Cape Finisterre (1805) when a British fleet under Admiral Robert Calder fought an indecisive naval battle against French Admiral Pierre de Villeneuve's combined Franco-Spanish fleet as it was returning from the West Indies.

Trafalgar
Due to his military and nautical experience, and as the second in command of the Spanish ships under Federico Gravina, Escaño was appointed to speak for the Spanish captains at a meeting on the French flagship . It was his opinion that it would be best to remain within the Bay of Cadiz and not try to breakout of the British naval blockade, which had been reinforced by Admiral Horatio Nelson. This was contrary to Napoleon's orders to French Admiral Pierre de Villeneuve, who ignored this advice and ordered the Franco-Spanish fleet to sail out against Nelson and his ships. Escaño was temporarily the acting commander of the Spanish ships due to Gravina being severely wounded during the Battle of Trafalgar (both were on the Spanish flagship Príncipe de Asturias, one of the few ships to not surrender and make it back to Cádiz). Despite having been wounded himself during the battle, Escaño communicated to Spanish Prime Minister Manuel Godoy the results of the battle since "the situation in which Lieutenant General Don Federico Gravina finds himself, as a result of a shrapnel bullet that at the end of yesterday's action he received in his left arm, does not allow him to give V.E. (His Excellency) news of this bloody combat".

Later life
Escaño was promoted to lieutenant general of the Navy and was the Minister of the Navy between 1808 and 1810. In 1810 he was elected to be a member of the Council of Regency of Spain and the Indies. When this body resigned after the convening of the Cortes of Cádiz, he was the only member who was authorized to continue to reside in the city and became a member of the Cortes which developed the Spanish Constitution of 1812. Escaño was appointed captain general of Cartagena in 1814, a position he did not assume since he died a few days later.

Legacy
There is a Spanish Navy school that bears his name: Escuela de Especialidades (School of Specialties) "Antonio de Escaño", located in Ferrol, Spain. The major areas of expertise are Telecommunications Systems, Weapons Systems, and Power and Propulsion Systems.

References 
Content in this article is translated from the existing Spanish Wikipedia article at :es:Antonio de Escaño; see its history for attribution.

Bibliography

External links

 Escuela de Especialidades "Antonio de Escaño" (PDF)
Escuela de Especialidades Antonio de Escaño (school website)

1750 births
1814 deaths
Military personnel from Cartagena, Spain